Sonic Brew is the debut studio album by American heavy metal band Black Label Society, released on October 28, 1998 in Japan and May 4, 1999 in the US by Spitfire Records. Unlike the albums that followed, this album still possessed a distinct Southern rock overtone that up to this time had predominated Zakk Wylde's solo writing style. It contained 13 tracks (lacking "Lost My Better Half" and "No More Tears"); the cover art was printed on clear plastic, with a separate paper booklet. The back cover was printed with golden ink, and the packaging was, overall, a lot higher quality than all later versions.

There was a long delay before it was released outside Japan, because the drums and vocals were buried on some of the tracks towards the end of the disc, so it was collectively decided to remix it for the US release. Due to the delay, Wylde and drummer Phil Ondich decided to give the US an added bonus and went to the studio in California and recorded the aggressive "Lost My Better Half" as a one-off bonus track for the album - the recording of which reportedly prompted Wylde to pursue a heavier direction for the band's music thereafter. Sonic Brew was finally released on May 4, 1999 with a standard gloss-printed booklet. Early copies came packed with a free Zakk Wylde guitar pick.

Subsequently, the Johnnie Walker whisky company issued a cease and desist order to Wylde on the album cover, which had been designed to match, except for its wording, the distiller's graphic design for its bottles of Black Label Whisky. The band decided to reissue the album with a different album cover, this time merely the band's skull logo and as an added incentive, they wanted to record a further bonus track for the fans who wanted to buy this now-third version of the album. Wylde, Ondich, and Mike Inez of Alice in Chains (who alongside Wylde had helped write the original) recorded their cover of Ozzy Osbourne's "No More Tears" accordingly.

"Born to Lose" and "No More Tears" were released as promotional singles for the album, though no videos were made. Bored to Tears had a promotional video released for the album's 20th anniversary.

On May 17, 2019, Black Label Society released the 20th Anniversary Edition of Sonic Brew, titled Sonic Brew - 20th Anniversary Blend 5.99 - 5.19. The reissued album contains two bonus tracks, a piano version of "Spoke in the Wheel", "Bored to Tears", and an acoustic version of "Black Pearl". On May 31, 2019, the reissued album was ranked number 8 on Billboards Top Independent Albums Chart.

Track listing

Notes
The song "Mother Mary" originated as an unreleased Pride & Glory demo, a live version of which was performed during Pride & Glory's set at the Donington Monsters of Rock Festival in 1994. The Black Label Society version is almost completely different both musically and lyrically but both do share the same basic chorus lyrics.
This version of song "Peddlers of Death" has a main riff similar to Black Sabbath's "Sweet Leaf" from Master of Reality. The original version of the song was an acoustic bonus track Zakk Wylde's Book of Shadows album.

Personnel
Black Label Society
Zakk Wylde – guitars, vocals, bass, piano
Phil Ondich – drums
Mike Inez – bass on "No More Tears"

Production
Produced and mixed by Ron Albert, Howard Albert, and Zakk Wylde, except tracks 10 and 15 (Wylde)
Engineered and mixed by Lee DeCarlo, assisted by Rony Brack
Mastered by Frank Cesarano

References

1999 debut albums
Black Label Society albums
Spitfire Records albums
Albums produced by the Albert Brothers